Grit Jurack (born 22 October 1977) is a former German handball player, who played on the German women's national handball team. She was Top Scorer in the 2007 World Women's Handball Championship and included on the All-Star Team., and also obtained bronze medal in the championship. She won the Champions League with Viborg HK in 2009 and was the top scorer of the tournament with 113 goals. She ended her handball career on 7 October 2012 due to a shoulder injury.

European championships
At the 2004 European Women's Handball Championship Jurack was included in the All-star team, as best right back, when Germany finished 5th at the tournament. She represented Germany at the 2006 European Women's Handball Championship, where they finished 4th. She was also selected into the all-star-team at the 2008 European Women's Handball Championship, as best right back, where Germany finished 4th.

National team

Performance in Olympic Games 
 1996 : 6th place
 2008 : 11th place

Performance in World Championship 
 1997 : Third place (Bronze medal)
 1999 : 7th place
 2003 : 12th place
 2005 : 6th place
 2007 : Third place (Bronze medal)

Performance in European Championship 
 1996 : 4th place
 1998 : 6th place
 2000 : 9th place
 2004 : 5th place
 2006 : 4th place
 2008 : 4th place

References

1977 births
Living people
German female handball players
Handball players at the 1996 Summer Olympics
Handball players at the 2008 Summer Olympics
Olympic handball players of Germany
Viborg HK players